Kenneth Alistair Coghill (born 10 November 1944 in Mansfield, Victoria) is a former Australian politician.

Life and career
Educated at Caulfield Grammar School, Coghill studied Veterinary Science at the University of Melbourne and worked as a veterinarian before serving on the Wodonga City Council. He entered the Victorian Legislative Assembly as a Labor Party Member for Werribee in the 1979 State elections, and served as the Speaker of the Victorian Legislative Assembly from 1988 to 1992.

After retiring from Parliament in 1995, he earned a Ph.D. from the University of Melbourne. He is currently an associate professor at Monash University.

See also
 List of Caulfield Grammar School people

References

External links
 Parliament of Victoria biography

Academic staff of Monash University
1944 births
Living people
Australian Labor Party members of the Parliament of Victoria
People educated at Caulfield Grammar School
University of Melbourne alumni
Members of the Victorian Legislative Assembly
Speakers of the Victorian Legislative Assembly
People from Victoria (Australia)
Australian veterinarians
Male veterinarians